Ivan "Iko" Buljan (born 11 December 1949) is Croatian sport manager and a former Yugoslavian footballer, who played as a defender. He was a member of the Yugoslavia squad at the 1974 FIFA World Cup and UEFA Euro 1976.

Playing career 
Buljan was born in Runovići village near Imotski. Ethnically Croatian, he was capped for the Yugoslavia national team 36 times. He reached the European Cup final 1979–80 with Hamburger SV where the club ultimately lost to Nottingham Forest. He is also known by his nickname Iko.

Buljan started his career with local club NK Mračaj before moving to the first-league team Hajduk Split in 1967. In 1975, he was selected as Večernji list's top player in Yugoslavia. Buljan finally left Hajduk in 1977 for Hamburger SV where he played until 1981. He then finished his career with two seasons with the New York Cosmos.

Managerial career 
From 2008 to 2009, he was the sporting director at HNK Hajduk Split.

Honours

Individual 
Yugoslav Footballer of the Year: 1975

References

External links
 
 Career stats of Ivan Buljan on Serbian national football team website 
 New York Cosmos stats

1949 births
Living people
People from Split-Dalmatia County
Association football central defenders
Yugoslav footballers
Yugoslavia under-21 international footballers
Yugoslavia international footballers
1974 FIFA World Cup players
UEFA Euro 1976 players
HNK Hajduk Split players
Hamburger SV players
New York Cosmos players
Yugoslav First League players
Bundesliga players
North American Soccer League (1968–1984) players
Yugoslav expatriate footballers
Expatriate footballers in West Germany
Yugoslav expatriate sportspeople in West Germany
Expatriate soccer players in the United States
Yugoslav expatriate sportspeople in the United States
Croatian football managers
HNK Hajduk Split managers
Étoile Sportive du Sahel managers
HNK Šibenik managers
Al-Wakrah SC managers
Al-Salmiya SC managers
Kuwait Premier League managers
Croatian expatriate football managers
Expatriate football managers in Tunisia
Croatian expatriate sportspeople in Tunisia
Expatriate football managers in Qatar
Croatian expatriate sportspeople in Qatar
Expatriate football managers in Kuwait
Croatian expatriate sportspeople in Kuwait